Ila Tilmitha is the sixteenth album by Kathem Al Saher, released on November 11, 2004. The album contains collaborations with Asmaa Lemnawar.

Track listing

External links
Kazem Al-Saher: Ila Tilmitha album at shamra.com 
Lyrics and videos from the album Ila Tilmitha on Shawshara.com

2007 albums
Arabic-language albums
Kadim Al Sahir albums
Rotana Records albums